Mojibul Hoque was a Bangladesh Army officer and commander of Operation Dal-Bhaat. He was killed in the Bangladesh Rifles mutiny in 2009.

Career
Hoque was a counsel at the Bangladesh Embassy in Thailand from 2003 to 2007. He was the United Nations Mission Sector Commandor of Gali Sector in Georgia. He was the commander of the Bangladesh Rifles Dhaka Sector. He was the commanding officer of Operation Dal-Bhaat which was launched by the Caretaker Government during 2007-2008 Bangladesh political crises. He planned to retire on 3 April 2009.

Death
Hoque was present at the Bangladesh Rifles Headquarters when the BDR Mutiny started on 25 February 2009. He was taken prisoner by mutinous soldiers. He was then killed in the third floor of a building by Lance Nayek Anwar, Havildar Yusuf, and Sepoy Bazlur Rashid. He was shot and then thrown out of the window.

Personal life
Hoque was married to Nehreen Ferdousi. Judge Md Akhtaruzzaman of the Dhaka metropolitan sessions court sentenced 152 mutineers to death, 158 to life imprisonments, and 251 were sentenced to various jail terms in 2013. The verdict was upheld by the Bangladesh High Court in 2017.

See also
Md Shawkat Imam-Fellow commander killed in the Mutiny
Gulzar Uddin Ahmed-BDR commander

References

2009 deaths
Bangladesh Army colonels
Bangladeshi diplomats